Ahmad Agung Setia Budi (born 9 March 1996) is an Indonesian professional footballer who plays as a defensive midfielder for Liga 1 club Bali United and the Indonesia national team.

Club career

PSIS Semarang
Before plays for PSIS Semarang, he joined Berlian Rajawali in the Liga Nusantara. And he showed his quality and always trusted to play as a starter when running pre-game season against Persija Jakarta and Persis Solo.

Bali United
On December 14, 2017, he signed a year contract with Bali United. Agung made his league debut on 16 April 2018 as a substitute in a match against Persela Lamongan at the Surajaya Stadium, Lamongan. On 2 December 2019, Bali United won the championship for the first time in their history, becoming the seventh club to win the Liga 1 after second placed Borneo draw to PSM, followed by a win in Semen Padang, giving Bali United a 17-point lead with only four games left.

PSM Makassar
In 2020, Agung signed a contract with Indonesian Liga 1 club PSM Makassar. He made his league debut on 1 March 2020 in a match against PSS Sleman at the Andi Mattalatta Stadium, Makassar. This season was suspended on 27 March 2020 due to the COVID-19 pandemic. The season was abandoned and was declared void on 20 January 2021.

Persik Kediri
In 2020, Ahmad Agung signed for Persik Kediri to play in Liga 1 in the 2021 season. He made his league debut on 27 August 2021, in a 1–0 loss against Bali United as substitute at the Gelora Bung Karno Stadium, Jakarta.

Return to Bali United (loan)
In January 2022, Ahmad Agung signed a contract with Liga 1 club Bali United on loan from Persik Kediri. He made his league debut in a 3–0 win against Barito Putera on 9 January 2022 as a substitute for Brwa Nouri in the 85th minute at the Ngurah Rai Stadium, Denpasar.

International career
In November 2021, Indonesian coach, Shin Tae-yong sent Agung his first call up to the full national side, for the friendly matches in Turkey against Afghanistan and Myanmar. He made his official international debut on 25 November 2021, against Myanmar in a friendly match in Antalya, Turkey.

Career statistics

Club

International

Honours

Club
PSIS Semarang
 Liga 2 third place (play-offs): 2017
Bali United
 Liga 1: 2019, 2021–22

International
Indonesia
 AFF Championship runner-up: 2020

References

External links
 
 Ahmad Agung at Liga Indonesia

1996 births
Living people
Indonesian footballers
Association football midfielders
Indonesia international footballers
PSIS Semarang players
Bali United F.C. players
PSM Makassar players
Persik Kediri players
Liga 1 (Indonesia) players
Liga 2 (Indonesia) players
People from Demak Regency
Sportspeople from Central Java